Louise Hervieu (26 October 1878 – 11 September 1954) was a French writer, artist, painter, draftsman, and lithographer.

Biography 
Syphilitic of birth, of very fragile health, Louise Hervieu revealed a gift for drawing from her childhood. Discouraged after the failure of her unique exhibition of paintings in oil in 1910, she abandoned painting in favor of drawing and lithography. She illustrated les Fleurs du mal and le Spleen de Paris by Baudelaire. She published collections of drawings and novels that she embellished with her illustrations. She was close to the painter , with whom she traveled several times to Bréhal. In 1915, the weakening of her sight forced her to go from color to black and white. A refined valorist, her technique of drawing in the wash or charcoal was characterized by the removal of certain parts of the surface of the work to obtain clear nuances by making reappear the white of the paper.

One of her works, le Bon Vouloir, was crowned by the Académie française and another one, Sangs, was awarded the prix Femina in 1936. This award allowed her to give great publicity to the battle she led throughout her life against this scourge that made her suffer constantly.

It is to Louise Hervieu that is also owed the attribution, obtained from a hard struggle in 1938, of a "health notebook", by the public authorities, to every newborn child, and in which would have been inscribed the antecedents of the parents, then all the care, all the diseases of the child, and then of the adult until his/her death, to serve in turn to keep his/her children and grandchildren healthy.

The Association Louise Hervieu for the establishment of the health notebook, was created for this purpose. On 1 June 1939, finally, a ministerial decree instituted the health card for the use of French citizens. This notebook unfortunately only had an ephemeral existence.

The rue Louise Hervieu, a street in the 12th arrondissement of Paris, pays homage to her.

Literary works 
1921: Entretiens sur le dessin avec Geneviève, Bernheim-Jeune, Paris
1927: Le Bon Vouloir, Librairie de France, Paris, distinguished by the Académie française.
1928: Montsouris, Émile-Paul frères, Paris
1936: Sangs, Éditions Denoël and Steele, Paris, prix Femina.
1937: Le Crime, Denoël
1942: Lettres à Lucy Krohg, Association
1943: Le malade vous parle, Denoël
1953: La Rose de sang, ou Le Printemps de la jeune Heredote, P. Cailler, Geneva

Pictorial works 
Illustrations
 Vingt nus, Librairie de France, Paris
 Les Fleurs du mal, Ollendorff, Paris, 1920
 Poèmes de Baudelaire, illustrations and foreword by Louise Hervieu, Textes Prétextes, Paris, 1946
 Réminiscences, Compagnie française des arts graphiques, Paris, 1946
 Liturgies intimes, Paul Verlaine, illustrations by Louise Hervieu, Éditions Manuel Bruker, 1948
Musée national d’Art moderne de Paris
 Dédié à Baudelaire, before 1922
 Le Christ enchainé de Suippes, before 1922 
 Nu dans un intérieur renaissance, before 1925
 La madeleine et le philosophe, before 1927 
 Nu dans un intérieur de style, before 1927 
 Choix de coquillages, before 1931
 Fleurs de cerisier, 1934  
 Tête de clown, 1934  
 Noir sur noir, 1934  
 Fruits, 1934  
 Vieux dieux chinois, 1934  
 Massacre de cerf, 1934  
 La pendule, before 1939 
 Les pommes, c. 1941 
 Les poires, c. 1941  
 Le salon du carnet de santé 
 Plumes    
 Femme malade 
Musée du Louvre, département des arts graphiques
 Coquillages et colliers, RF 36812, recto
 Nœud noir et plume d'autruche blanche, RF 40961, recto  
 Vieille paysanne assise, de face, en train de coudre, RF 28788, recto

Bibliography 
 Pierre Courthion, Panorama de la peinture française contemporaine, Simon Kra, 1927, (pp. 142–145)
 Claude Roger-Marx, Éloge de Louise Hervieu, Manuel Bruker Éditeur, 1953
 Guillaume d’Enfert, Louise Hervieu et Bretteville-sur-Ay. Hommage à Louise Hervieu, publié à l’occasion du 2e Salon des écrivains du terroir de Bretteville-sur-Ay, Éditions du Jardin d’Eden, 2004
 Sanchez Nelly, « Prix Femina 1936 : Sangs de Louise Hervieu », New Zealand Journal of French Studies, 2013, n°2, vol. 34, (pp. 41–54) 
 Sanchez Nelly, « Louise Hervieu, dessinatrice et littératrice », La Corne de Brume, 2013, n°10, (pp. 41–46)

External links 
 Official website of Louise Hervieu
 Louise Hervieu, du dessin au carnet de santé par Guillaume d’Enfert on CAIRN
 Louise Hervieu on WikiManche
 Louise HERVIEU (1878 - 1954) on Stephen Ongpin Fine Art
 HERVIEU Louise Jeanne Aimée (1878 -1964) on Artprecium

20th-century French painters
French draughtsmen
20th-century French lithographers
20th-century French non-fiction writers
Writers from Normandy
20th-century French women writers
French feminist writers
Prix Femina winners
1878 births
1954 deaths